This list of fictional cats and other felines in comics is subsidiary to the list of fictional cats. It is restricted solely to notable feline characters from notable comics. For characters that appear in several separate comics, only the earliest appearance will be recorded here.

See also
List of fictional cats
Top Cat,
Tom (of Tom & Jerry),
Felix the Cat!

References

 
Comics
Fictional cats in comics
Cats